Amy Suiter was an interim head coach of the Texas Tech Red Raiders softball team for the 2009 season. She formerly served as an assistant under head coach Teresa Wilson. She played college softball at the University of Washington. Suiter was relieved of her duties on May 18, 2009, and later replaced by Shanon Hays.

She is now currently the head coach of Western Washington University's softball team.

References

External links
Profile at Western Washington
Profile at Texas Tech Athletics

Year of birth missing (living people)
Living people
American softball coaches
Texas Tech Red Raiders softball coaches
Washington Huskies softball players
Western Washington Vikings softball coaches